The 9th Golden Horse Awards (Mandarin:第9屆金馬獎) took place on October 30, 1971 at Zhongshan Hall in Taipei, Taiwan.

Winners and nominees 
Winners are listed first, highlighted in boldface.

References

9th
1971 film awards
1971 in Taiwan